Schuetze reagent, also written as Schütze reagent, is made up of iodine pentoxide (I2O5) and sulfuric acid on granular silica gel. It is used to convert carbon monoxide (CO) into carbon dioxide (CO2) at room temperature. This can be used as a method for assaying carbon content in quality control of the production of uranium carbide fuel for nuclear reactors.

References

Oxidizing mixtures
Iodine compounds
Oxides
Acidic oxides